Bryce Davis is a center for the Pittsburgh Steelers of the National Football League (NFL). He has also played for the Cincinnati Bengals.

References

American football long snappers
1989 births
Living people
Central Oklahoma Bronchos football players
People from Duncan, Oklahoma
Pittsburgh Steelers players
Cincinnati Bengals players